The razor-backed musk turtle (Sternotherus carinatus) is a species of turtle in the family Kinosternidae. The species is native to the southern United States. There are no subspecies that are recognized as being valid.

Geographic range
S. carinatus is found in the states of Alabama, Arkansas, Louisiana, Mississippi, Oklahoma, Florida, and Texas.

Description

It has a brown-colored carapace, with black markings at the edges of each scute. The carapace has a distinct, sharp keel down the center of its length, giving the species its common name.

The body is typically grey-brown in color, with black spotting, as is the head, which tends to have a bulbous shape to it. It has a long neck, short legs, and a sharp beak. Males can usually be distinguished from females by their longer tails.

The plastron is small, with only one hinge which is located anteriorly. There is no gular scute. Barbels are present on the chin only.

Behavior
S. carinatus is almost entirely aquatic, spending most of its time in shallow, heavily vegetated, slow-moving creeks, ponds, streams, and swamps. The only time it typically ventures onto land is when the female lays eggs. However, both sexes bask often.

Diet
The diet of S. carinatus consists primarily of aquatic invertebrates, including freshwater clams, crayfish, snails, and various insects. It also feeds on fish, amphibians, carrion, seeds, and aquatic plants.

In captivity
The razor-backed musk turtle is frequently kept in captivity, and is regularly captive bred. Its relatively small size, hardiness and ease of care makes it a more attractive choice as a pet turtle for many keepers, than the more commonly available red-eared slider (Trachemys scripta elegans). There is disagreement in sources how old musk turtles can get in captivity with estimates ranging between 20 and 50 years.

References

Further reading
Boulenger GA (1889). Catalogue of the Chelonians, Rhynchocephalians, and Crocodiles in the British Museum (Natural History). New Edition. London: Trustees of the British Museum (Natural History). (Taylor and Francis, printers). x + 311 pp. + Plates I-III. (Cinosternum carinatum, p. 38).
Carr AF (1952). Handbook of Turtles: The Turtles of the United States, Canada, and Baja California. Ithaca, New York: Comstock Publishing Associates, a Division of Cornell University Press. 542 pp. 
Goin CJ, Goin OB, Zug GR (1978). Introduction to Herpetology, Third Edition. San Francisco: W.H. Freeman. xi + 378 pp. . (Sternotherus carinatus, p. 263).
Gray JE (1856). "On some New Species of Freshwater Tortoises from North America, Ceylon and Australia". Ann. Mag. Nat. Hist., Second Series 18: 263–268. (Aromochelys carinata, new species, p. 266).
Powell R, Conant R, Collins JT (2016). Peterson Field Guide to Reptiles and Amphibians of Eastern and Central North America, Fourth Edition. Boston and New York: Houghton Mifflin Harcourt. xiv + 494 pp., 47 plates, 207 figures. . (Sternotherus carinatus, pp. 227–228 + Plate 19 + Figures 86, 104).
Stejneger L, Barbour T (1917). A Check List of North American Amphibians and Reptiles. Cambridge, Massachusetts: Harvard University Press. 125 pp. (Kinosternon carinatum, p. 111).
Tinkle DW, Webb RG (1955). "A new species of Sternotherus with a discussion of the Sternotherus carinatus complex (Chelonia, Kinosternidae)". Tulane Studies in Zoology 3 (3): 53–67.

External links
Austin's Turtle Pages: Razorback Musk
Turtles of the World: Sternotherus carinatus

Sternotherus
Reptiles described in 1855
Taxa named by John Edward Gray
Reptiles of the United States
Fauna of the Southeastern United States
Fauna of the Plains-Midwest (United States)